Pablo Santos and Gabriel Trujillo-Soler were the defending champions. Trujillo-Soler chose to not play this year.
Santos partnered up with Paul Capdeville, but they were eliminated by Konstantin Kravchuk and Ivan Sergeyev.
Ivo Klec and Artem Smirnov won in the final 1–6, 6–3, [10–3] against Kravchuk and Sergeyev.

Seeds

Main draw

Draw

References
 Main Draw

ZRE Katowice Bytom Open - Doubles
ZRE Katowice Bytom Open